The second season of the Syfy reality television series Face Off premiered on January 11, 2012 and ended on March 14, 2012. The season featured 14 prosthetic makeup artists competing in a series of challenges to create makeup effects. The winner of this season, Rayce Bird of Shelley, Idaho, received  cash,  worth of makeup from Alcone, and the 2012 Toyota Camry Hybrid.

The season 2 premiere episode posted the best ratings performance for any Syfy original series since November 2009.

Judges
Glenn Hetrick
Ve Neill
Patrick Tatopoulos
McKenzie Westmore (Host)

Contestants

Production
Guest judges for the season include Asher Roth, Tom Savini, Catherine O'Hara, Sam Huntington, Vivica A. Fox and LeVar Burton.

Contestant progress

 The contestant won Face Off.
  The contestant was a runner-up.
 The contestant won a Spotlight Challenge.
 The contestant was part of a team that won the Spotlight Challenge.
 The contestant was in the top in the Spotlight Challenge.
 The contestant was declared one of the best in the Spotlight Challenge but was not in the running for the win.
 The contestant was in the bottom in the Spotlight Challenge.
 The contestant was a teammate of the eliminated contestant in the Spotlight Challenge.
 The contestant was eliminated.
‡ The contestant won the Foundation Challenge.

Episodes

{| class="wikitable plainrowheaders" style="width:100%; margin:auto;"
|-
|-style="color:white"
! scope="col" style="background-color: #b1b3a8; width:12em;" |No. inseries
! scope="col" style="background-color: #b1b3a8; width:12em;" |No. inseason
! scope="col" style="background-color: #b1b3a8;" |Title
! scope="col" style="background-color: #b1b3a8; width:12em;" |Original air date
! scope="col" style="background-color: #b1b3a8; width:12em;" |U.S. viewers(million)
! scope="col" style="background-color: #b1b3a8; width:12em;" |18-49Rating

|}

Footnotes

 Brea's model for the Spotlight Challenge passed out and was taken to the hospital. She was given a new model to work with and was allowed to perform the same body painting on the new model. He was later superimposed over the photo taken of Matt's model and their backdrop.
 Ian's model had a bad reaction to the makeup and left the reveal stage after judging.
 Other animals provided to the contestants included a white rhinoceros and gray wolves
 RJ's model had a bad reaction to the makeup and was replaced with a model who was unrelated to the models on his team.
 One of the Greens was a fraternal triplet to the other two identicals.
 Rayce's trio of makeups was the audience favorite, something that would be taken into consideration when the judges made their final decision.

References

External links

 
 

2012 American television seasons
Face Off (TV series)